The Waiter Rule refers to a common belief that one's true character can be gleaned from how one treats staff or service workers, such as a "waiter". The rule was one of William H. Swanson's 33 Unwritten Rules of Management, which was copied from Dave Barry's version: "If someone is nice to you but rude to the waiter, they are not a nice person."

References

Interpersonal relationships